This is a list of the members of the Dewan Rakyat (House of Representatives) of the 2nd Parliament of Malaysia, elected in 1964.

Composition

Elected members by state


Unless noted otherwise, the MPs served the entire term of the parliament (from 18 May 1964 until 20 March 1969).

Perlis

Kedah

Kelantan

Trengganu

Penang

Perak

Pahang

Selangor

Negri Sembilan

Malacca

Johore

Appointed and nominated members by state
Unless noted otherwise, the MPs served the entire term of the parliament (from 18 May 1964 until 20 March 1969).

Singapore

Sabah

Sarawak

Notes

References

Abdullah, Z. G., Adnan, H. N., & Lee, K. H. (1997). Malaysia, tokoh dulu dan kini = Malaysian personalities, past and present. Kuala Lumpur, Malaysia: Penerbit Universiti Malaya.
Anzagain Sdn. Bhd. (2004). Almanak keputusan pilihan raya umum: Parlimen & Dewan Undangan Negeri, 1959-1999. Shah Alam, Selangor: Anzagain.
Chin, U.-H. (1996). Chinese politics in Sarawak: A study of the Sarawak United People's Party. Kuala Lumpur: Oxford University Press.
Faisal, S. H. (2012). Domination and Contestation: Muslim Bumiputera Politics in Sarawak. Institute of Southeast Asian Studies.
Hussain, M. (1987). Membangun demokrasi: Pilihanraya di Malaysia. Kuala Lumpur: Karya Bistari.
Ibnu, H. (1993). PAS kuasai Malaysia?: 1950-2000 sejarah kebangkitan dan masa depan. Kuala Lumpur: GG Edar.
Surohanjaya Pilehanraya Malaysia. (1965). Penyata pilehanraya-pilehanraya umum parlimen (Dewan Ra'ayat) dan dewan-dewan negeri, tahun 1964 bagi negeri-negeri Tanah Melayu. Kuala Lumpur: Jabatan Chetak Kerajaan.

Malaysian parliaments
Lists of members of the Dewan Rakyat